Russell Robartes, FRS (1671–1719) was an English politician who sat in the English and British House of Commons from 1693 to 1713.

Robartes was the second son of Robert Robartes, Viscount Bodmin and his wife Sarah Bodvel, daughter of John Bodvel, and younger brother of Charles Robartes, 2nd Earl of Radnor. He was educated at a private school in London and entered St. John’s College, Cambridge in 1689.

After serving in Flanders as an army volunteer in the 1693 campaign, Robartes was elected Member of Parliament for Bodmin at a by-election later that year, sitting until 1702. From 1702 to 1708 he sat for Lostwithiel, returning to sit for Bodmin again from 1708 to 1713. In 1703 he was elected a Fellow of the Royal Society.

He was appointed Teller of the Exchequer in 1710, succeeding his relative Francis Robartes, but lost the post in 1714 when he went to live in Paris and failed to return in good time.
 
Robartes died in 1719 and was buried in Chelsea, London. He had married Lady Mary, the daughter of Henry Booth, 1st Earl of Warrington, with whom he had 2 sons and 2 daughters. Their eldest son, Henry, became the 3rd Earl of Radnor in 1723.

References

 

E
1671 births
1719 deaths
Alumni of St John's College, Cambridge
Fellows of the Royal Society
Robartes, Russell
English MPs 1690–1695
English MPs 1695–1698
English MPs 1698–1700
English MPs 1701–1702
English MPs 1702–1705
English MPs 1705–1707
Members of the Parliament of Great Britain for constituencies in Cornwall
British MPs 1707–1708
British MPs 1708–1710
British MPs 1710–1713